Between 1981-2016, Euromoney magazine awarded the Finance Minister of the Year award. This award was given to a country Finance Minister who reformed or innovated their countries economy during their tenure. In Australia, the award is colloquially nicknamed "World's Greatest Treasurer" after Paul Keating won in 1984. The award has not been given since 2017, with the magazine focusing their articles and awards on Banking Excellence.

Past recipients are listed below.

1981 Turgut Özal of Turkey
1982 Hon Sui Sen of Singapore
1983 Jesús Silva Herzog of Mexico
1984 Paul Keating of Australia
1985 Roger Douglas of New Zealand
1986  James Baker of the United States of America
1987 Edouard Balladur of France
1988 Nigel Lawson of the United Kingdom
1989 J. B. Sumarlin of Indonesia
1990 Philippe Maystadt of Belgium
1991 Carlos Solchaga of Spain
1992 Domingo Cavallo of Argentina
1993 Manmohan Singh of India
1994 Iiro Viinanen of Finland
1995 Roberto de Ocampo of the Philippines
1996 Robert Rubin of the United States of America
1997 Anatoly Chubais of Russia
1998 Leszek Balcerowicz of Poland
1999 José Ángel Gurría of Mexico
2000 Brigita Schmögnerová of Slovakia
2001 Shaukat Aziz of Pakistan
2002 Milen Veltchev of Bulgaria
2003 Ibrahim bin Abdulaziz Al-Assaf of Saudi Arabia
2004 Ivan Miklos of Slovakia
2005 Ngozi Okonjo-Iweala of Nigeria
2006 Sri Mulyani Indrawati of Indonesia
2007 Mlađan Dinkić of Serbia
2008 Xie Xuren of China
2009 Jim Flaherty of Canada
2010 Alexei Kudrin of Russia
2011 Wayne Swan of Australia
2012 Cesar Purisima of Philippines
2013 Tharman Shanmugaratnam of Singapore
2014 Luis Videgaray Caso of Mexico
2015 Mauricio Cárdenas Santamaría of Colombia
2016 Alfonso Prat-Gay of Argentina

References

Politics awards
Daily Mail and General Trust